Andy Willock (born 13 January 1964) is an English former football midfielder.

Willock began his career with Coventry City, but did not make a first team appearance, and joined Rangers. He did not play for the Glasgow club either, and played in New Zealand in 1983 for University-Mount Wellington. He returned to Scotland and joined Clyde, where he had the best spell of his career, making over 200 appearances. He left Clyde in 1989 and had two year spells at Ayr United, Dumbarton and Alloa Athletic, before playing his final season with Albion Rovers.

External links

Living people
1964 births
English footballers
Association football wingers
Coventry City F.C. players
Rangers F.C. players
University-Mount Wellington players
Clyde F.C. players
Ayr United F.C. players
Dumbarton F.C. players
Alloa Athletic F.C. players
Albion Rovers F.C. players
Scottish Football League players
Expatriate association footballers in New Zealand